The qualification for the 2020 Men's Olympic Handball Tournament assigned quota places to twelve teams: the hosts, the world champion, four winners of continental events and six teams from the World Olympic qualification tournaments respectively. (The Olympics were postponed to 2021 due to the COVID-19 pandemic).

Qualification summary

Legend for qualification type

Host country

World Championship

Continental qualification

Europe

Asia

Preliminary round
''All times are local (UTC+3).

Group A

Group B

Knockout stage

Bracket

5–8th place semifinals

Semifinals

Seventh place game

Fifth place game

Third place game

Final

Final standing

America

Africa

Olympic Qualification Tournaments

2020 Olympic Qualification Tournament #1

2020 Olympic Qualification Tournament #2

2020 Olympic Qualification Tournament #3

References

Men's qualification
Handball Men
Olympics